Poltava Province may refer to:
Poltava Oblast, subdivision of Ukraine
Poltava Governorate, subdivision of the Russian Empire